Lavern George Holtgrave (born October 18, 1942) is an American former professional baseball player, a right-handed pitcher who played for six pro seasons (1961–1966) and appeared in one Major League Baseball game for the  Detroit Tigers.

Holtgrave was in his fifth season in the Detroit organization when he was recalled at the close of the 1965 season. He had appeared in 49 games in minor league baseball that season, all but one as a relief pitcher, and posted a 2.06 earned run average in 77 innings pitched. In his lone Major League appearance, on September 26, 1965, against the Cleveland Indians, he relieved Phil Regan with Detroit trailing 5–0. He held the Indians off the scoreboard in the fourth and fifth innings but in his third frame, he gave up two earned runs on RBI hits by pitcher Tom Kelley and Leon Wagner.  All told, in three MLB innings, Holtgrave surrendered four hits, two runs and two bases on balls, with two strikeouts.  He retired after the 1966 season.

References

External links

1942 births
Living people
Baseball players from Illinois
Decatur Commodores players
Detroit Tigers players
Duluth-Superior Dukes players
Knoxville Smokies players
Major League Baseball pitchers
Montgomery Rebels players
People from Clinton County, Illinois
Syracuse Chiefs players